Tyrell Rayne (born August 10, 1994) is a soccer player. Born in Canada, he represents Antigua & Barbuda internationally.

Career

College
In 2012, he played for the University of Toronto Varsity Blues, playing in all 14 of the team's games, scoring two goals.

Club
In 2014, began playing in League1 Ontario with Master's FA. In 2014, he was an Honourable Mention on the league's Young Stars year-end All-Stars team. In 2015, he was named a league Second-team All-Star. In 2016, played in the league All-Star game for the East Division, and was he was once again named a league-wide Second-team All-Star, after scoring 14 goals in 18 games.

In 2017, he joined Durham United FA, with whom he scored 7 goals in 20 games, which led his team, including a hat trick on September 16 against Ottawa South United. Prior to the season, he scored a goal in an exhibition game with the League1 Ontario All-stars against professional USL club Ottawa Fury FC.

In 2018 and 2019, he played with the Woodbridge Strikers, scoring 8 goals in 29 league games, while also appearing in 5 playoff games.

International
In September 2019, he was called up to the Antigua and Barbuda national team ahead of a pair of CONCACAF Nations League games, being the only overseas player in the squad. He made his debut on September 7 against Jamaica.

References

External links

1994 births
Living people
Association football defenders
Master's FA players
League1 Ontario players
Woodbridge Strikers players
Toronto Varsity Blues soccer players
Antigua and Barbuda international footballers
Soccer players from Toronto
Antigua and Barbuda footballers
Pickering FC players